This is a list of the European Hot 100 Singles and European Top 100 Albums number ones of 2003. After Music & Media ceased in August 2003, Billboard took over publication of both pan-European charts.

Chart history

Notes

References

Europe
2003
2003